Scelotes is a genus of small African skinks.

Species
The following 21 species are recognized as being valid.
Scelotes anguins (Boulenger, 1887) – Algoa dwarf burrowing skink, Boulenger's burrowing skink,
Scelotes arenicola (W. Peters, 1854) – Zululand dwarf burrowing skink
Scelotes bidigittatus FitzSimons, 1930 – Lowveld dwarf burrowing skink 
Scelotes bipes (Linnaeus, 1766) – silvery dwarf burrowing skink, common burrowing skink
Scelotes caffer (W. Peters, 1861) – Cape dwarf burrowing skink, Peters's burrowing skink
Scelotes capensis (A. Smith, 1849) – western dwarf burrowing skink, cape burrowing skink
Scelotes duttoni Broadley, 1990
Scelotes farquharsoni Raw, 2020
Scelotes fitzsimonsi Broadley, 1994 – Fitzsimons's dwarf burrowing skink
Scelotes gronovii (Daudin, 1802) – Gronovi's dwarf burrowing skink
Scelotes guentheri Boulenger, 1887 – Günther's dwarf burrowing skink
Scelotes inornatus (A. Smith, 1849) – Durban dwarf burrowing skink, legless burrowing skink
Scelotes insularis Broadley, 1990
Scelotes kasneri FitzSimons, 1939 – Kasner's dwarf burrowing skink
Scelotes limpopoensis FitzSimons, 1930 – Limpopo burrowing skink
Scelotes mirus (Roux, 1907) – montane dwarf burrowing skink
Scelotes montispectus Bauer, Whiting & Sadlier, 2003 – Bloubergstrand dwarf burrowing skink
Scelotes mossambicus (W. Peters, 1882) – Mozambique dwarf burrowing skink
Scelotes poensis Bocage, 1895 – Fernando Po burrowing skink
Scelotes sexlineatus (Harlan, 1824) – striped dwarf burrowing skink
Scelotes uluguruensis Barbour & Loveridge, 1928 – Uluguru fossorial skink
Scelotes vestigifer Broadley, 1994 – coastal dwarf burrowing skink

Nota bene: A binomial authority in parentheses indicates that the species was originally described in a genus other than Scelotes.

References

Further reading
Fitzinger L (1826). Neue Classification der Reptilien nach ihren natürlichen Verwandtschaften. Nebst einer Verwandtschafts-tafel und einem Verzeichnisse der Reptilien-Sammlung des k.k. zoologischen Museums zu Wien. Vienna: J.G. Heubner. 5 unnumbered pp. + 67 pp. + one plate. (Scelotes, new genus, pp. 23, 53). (in German and Latin).

Scelotes
Reptiles of Africa
Lizard genera
Taxa named by Leopold Fitzinger